Opisthostoma fraternum is a species of minute land snail with an operculum, a terrestrial gastropod mollusk in the family Diplommatinidae. It is endemic to Malaysia.  Its natural habitat is subtropical or tropical moist lowland forests. It is threatened by habitat loss.

Ecology 
Predators of Opisthostoma fraternum include larvae of Pteroptyx tener.

References

Endemic fauna of Malaysia
Invertebrates of Malaysia
Diplommatinidae
Taxonomy articles created by Polbot
Gastropods described in 1905